All the Good Times is the sixth album from The Nitty Gritty Dirt Band, released in January 1972.

Track listing
"Sixteen Tracks" (Jeff Hanna, Jim Ibbotson) – 5:22
"Fish Song" (Jimmie Fadden) – 4:28
"Jambalaya (On the Bayou)" (Hank Williams) – 3:20
"Down in Texas" (Eddie Hinton) – 2:20
"Creepin' Round Your Back Door" (Jimmie Fadden) – 2:52
"Daisy" (Jim Ibbotson) – 2:50
"Slim Carter" (Kenny O'Dell) – 3:02
"Hoping to Say" (David Hanna) – 3:20
"Baltimore" (Jim Ibbotson) – 3:44
"Jamaica Say You Will" (Jackson Browne) – 3:29
"Do You Feel It Too" (Richie Furay) – 3:15
"Civil War Trilogy" (Walter McEuen) – 1:53
"Diggy Liggy Lo" (J.D. Miller) – 2:20

Charts

Personnel
Jeff Hanna – arranger, guitar, vocals
Jimmie Fadden – arranger, drums, guitar, harmonica, vocals
John McEuen – arranger, guitar, steel guitar, vocals
Jim Ibbotson - drums, guitar, keyboards, vocals
Les Thompson – arranger, bass, guitar, vocals

Additional Musicians
Randy Scruggs – acoustic guitar
Norman Blake – dobro
Ellis Padgett – acoustic bass

Production
Producer – William E. McEuen

The Mini-Album
United Artists released a mini-album with the same name. It consisted of two 7 inch 33 1/3 RPM records. The first record contains five songs from the original album, "Baltimore", "Sixteen Tracks", "Slim Carter", "Fish Song", and "Jamaica, Say You Will". The second record contains a country jam and interview.

The country jam side is a "spontaneous acoustic recording" of three songs: "All The Good Times", "When Will I Be Loved", and "Mobile Line". It is all on one track that is 8:09 long.

The interview side was recorded in January 1972. It is one track 12:20 long. On it the Dirt Band discusses "Uncle Charlie VS. All The Good Times", "Acoustic Instruments", "Traditional Music", "Colorado Consciousness", and "Live Recording".

See also 
Nitty Gritty Dirt Band discography

References
All information comes from album liner notes, unless otherwise noted.

Nitty Gritty Dirt Band albums
1972 albums
United Artists Records albums